Ehsan Elahi Zaheer (31 May 1945 – 30 March 1987) was a Pakistani Islamic scholar. He was the founder of Jamiat Ahle Hadith. He died from an assassin's bomb blast in 1987. He was taken to Riyadh, Saudi Arabia in injured condition. He died there and was buried in Mazar-Al-Baqi.

Early life and education
Zaheer was born in 1940 in Sialkot into a deeply religious trading Punjabi family. His father Haji Zahoor Ilahi was a very religious person. He was formally educated from Gujranwala and Faisalabad before earning Masters in Arabic, Islamic studies, Urdu and Persian at the University of the Punjab and further continuing his studies in Islamic law at the University of Madinah under many scholars.

Political career

Tehreek-e-Istiqlal 
In 1972, Ehsan Elahi Zaheer joined the political party Tehreek-e-Istiqlal. After Ehsan Elahi joined the party, it became the second most popular party of Pakistan. Ehsan left the party in 1978.

Jamiat Ahle Hadith 
In March 1986, Zaheer founded his political party Jamiat Ahle Hadith. Zaheer used to criticize Zia-ul-Haq. After Zaheer was assassinated, the party was led by his son Ibtisam Elahi Zaheer.

Assassination
While Zaheer was giving a speech, a bomb which had been planted in the flowers on the stage exploded, killing him. Zaheer's family accused Iran-backed Shia militants of killing him.

Upon the request of Saudi Grand Mufti Abd al-Aziz Ibn Baz, Zaheer was transferred to Saudi Arabia for treatment at The National Guard Hospital. Medics could not save him from his severe wounds. His funeral prayer was led by Abd al-Aziz ibn Baz in Medina, Saudi Arabia, attended by millions including the country's main Islamic scholars, and he was buried in Al-Baqi cemetery.

Personal life 
Ehsan Elahi Zaheer had three sons: Ibtisam Elahi Zaheer, Hisham Elahi Zaheer and Motasim Elahi Zaheer.

Books
He mainly wrote in Arabic but his works have been translated into Urdu and many other languages:

Urdu
Mirzāʼiyyat aur Islām, Idārat Turjumān al-Sunnah, 1972, 240 p.

Arabic
al-Qadiyaniyat : dirasat wa-tahlil, Idārat Turjumān al-Sunnah, 1976, 320 p.
al-Shīʻah wa-al-Sunnah, Idārat Turjumān al-Sunnah, 1977, 216 p. 
al-Bābīyah : ʻarḍ wa-naqd, Idārat Tarjumān al-Sunnah, 1981, 288 p. 
al-Bahāʼīyah : naqd wa-taḥlīl, Idārat Tarjumān al-Sunnah, 1981, 375 p.
Aš-Šhīʻa wa-ahl al-bait, Idārat Tarjumān al-Sunnah, 1982, 316 p. 
Aš-Šhīʻa wa'l-Qurʼān, Idārat Tarjumān al-Sunnah, 1983, 352 p. 
al-Barīlawīya : ʻaqāʼid wa-taʼrīḫ, Idārat Tarjumān al-Sunnah, 1983, 253 p.
Bayna al-Shīʻah wa-ahl al-Sunnah, Idārat Tarjamān al-Sunnah, 1985, 218 p. 
Ismāīlīyah : tārīkh wa-aqāid, Idārah Tarjumān al-Sunnah, 1986, 757 p.

English translations
Ibn Taymiyyah's Kitab-al-wasilah. Foreword and translation under the guidance of Ehsan Elahi Zaheer.
Muhammad ibn Abd al-Wahhab's Kitab at-Tawheed. Foreword and translation under the guidance of Ehsan Elahi Zaheer.

References

1945 births
1987 deaths
University of the Punjab alumni
Islamic University of Madinah alumni
Pakistani Sunni Muslim scholars of Islam
People from Sialkot
Pakistani Salafis
Punjabi people
Critics of Shia Islam
Salafi Islamists
Burials at Jannat al-Baqī
Ahl-i Hadith people